Eve's Daughters is a 1928 Czech-German silent drama film directed by Karel Lamač and starring Anny Ondra, Karel Lamač and Wolfgang Zilzer.

The film's sets were designed by the art director Victor Trivas.

Cast
 Anny Ondra as Dancer Nina Laval
 Karel Lamač as Rudolf Bünzli
  as Marie Santo
 Wolfgang Zilzer as Baron Hans von Stetten
 Steffie Vida as Baroness Edith
 Theodor Pištěk as Baron Bihl / Tramp  
 Uli Tridenskaja as Rudolf's Mother  
 Albert Paulig as Detective Harry Pilka
 Václav Srb as Tramp  
 Friedel Seiler as Fisher's Daughter

References

External links

1928 films
French drama films
Films of the Weimar Republic
Czech silent films
German silent feature films
Films directed by Karel Lamač
German black-and-white films
1928 drama films
German drama films
Czech drama films
Bavaria Film films
Silent drama films
1920s French films
1920s German films